Doomguard may refer to:

 The Doomguard, a faction within the Planescape setting of the Dungeons & Dragons role-playing game.
 Doom Guard, a demonic race in the Warcraft universe.